Pershotravneve is an urban-type settlement in Korosten Raion, Zhytomyr Oblast, Ukraine. Population:  In 2011, the population was 2,620. 

The city was heavily affected by the Chernobyl disaster in 1986. During the 2022 Russian invasion of Ukraine, the settlement was occupied by Russia on 26 February 2022 and regained by Ukraine on 3 April 2022.

Geography 

The settlement is located several miles north of the small city of Ovruch,
where the Ovruch air base is located,
at the edge of the forests south of Belarus,
between the railroad tracks and highway M-21/P-31 towards the border.

References

Urban-type settlements in Korosten Raion
Korosten Raion